Alex Israel (born October 1982) is an American multimedia artist, writer, and eyewear designer from Los Angeles. His work includes large, colorful airbrushed paintings of abstract gradients and Los Angeles skies, his self-portraits, painted on shaped fiberglass panels, and multimedia installations constructed from movie-house props.

Early life and education
The son of a real estate developer, Israel grew up in Westwood alongside two sisters. He attended Harvard-Westlake School in Studio City before completing his undergraduate studies at Yale University in 2003. His first summer back from Yale, he worked part-time as an intern for the conceptual artist John Baldessari, and for Ann Goldstein, who was a curator at MOCA at the time. Later, he worked as an assistant at the gallery Blum & Poe before moving to New York City to work at Sotheby's auction house. After working for the artist Jason Rhoades, followed by a brief stint as a salesperson for Hauser & Wirth. He went on to receive a M.F.A. from the University of Southern California’s Roski School of Fine Arts in 2010.

Career

Museum collections
Work by Alex Israel is included in the collections of the Moderna Museet, Museum Boijmans Van Beuningen, MOCA, LACMA, Whitney Museum of American Art, MoMA, The Jewish Museum, Solomon R. Guggenheim Museum, and Astrup Fearnley Museet.

AS IT LAYS 
Between July 2011 and May 2012, Israel produced a web series called, "AS IT LAYS," in which he interviews 33 LA celebrities. The diverse group of subjects includes Rachel Zoe, Oliver Stone, Perez Hilton, Michael Chow, Jamie Lee Curtis, and Marilyn Manson. The first thirty videos were shot in the Pacific Design Center in West Hollywood, and on location at the subjects’ homes and offices. The series premiered during an exhibition at Reena Spauldings Fine Art March 11 through April 8, 2012. The first thirty videos were released online.

On May 19, 2012, The MOCA LA presented the series as a special one-night screening and performance event. In between screenings of video portraits, Israel created three additional interviews with surprise guests Laird Hamilton, Molly Ringwald and Melanie Griffith, in front of the live audience.

Easter Island Venice Beach 
From July 13–15, 2012, "Easter Island Venice Beach" was erected in the recreational area of Venice Beach as part of the Hammer Museum’s Venice Beach Biennial. Curated by Ali Subotnik, the installation plays off the Easter Island statues in the southeastern Pacific Island. Israel says that he was inspired when he found four giant replicas of the sculptures at a prop house in Hollywood a few years earlier.

Rough Winds 
The first of his video series, produced in 2010, invites viewers to "watch and follow the lives of jaded young adults as they navigate the golden light and melancholic shadows of life in the magical dreamscape of Los Angeles." The dialogue-free series is composed of a trailer and ten clips between two and six minutes long.

SPF-18
Israel directed SPF-18, a feature-length teen surf film and multi-platform project, which was released on Netflix and the ITunes Store on September 29, 2017. It featured Noah Centineo in a starring role in addition to Molly Ringwald.

References

Living people
Artists from Los Angeles
Yale University alumni
University of Southern California alumni
21st-century American male artists
1982 births
Harvard-Westlake School alumni
Eyewear people